Second Chance is an American science fiction crime drama television series created by Rand Ravich. It is inspired by the 1818 novel Frankenstein; or, The Modern Prometheus  by Mary Shelley; Frankenstein was an early title. The show debuted online on December 25, 2015, and started broadcasting January 13, 2016, on Fox. On January 29, 2016, Second Chance was moved to Fridays at 9 p.m. ET/PT, following poor ratings in its first two episodes, swapping time slots and days with Hell's Kitchen.

On May 12, 2016, Fox cancelled the series after one season.

Premise
The series follows the life of Jimmy Pritchard, a 75-year-old former King County, Washington sheriff (Philip Baker Hall) who was morally corrupt and eventually disgraced and forced to retire. After he is murdered, Pritchard is brought back to life in the improved body of a younger man (Robert Kazinsky) by billionaire tech-genius twins Mary (Dilshad Vadsaria) and Otto Goodwin (Adhir Kalyan). However, despite having a new life and a chance to relive his life and find a new purpose, the temptations that led to his career being tarnished continue to haunt him.

Cast and characters

Main
 Robert Kazinsky as Jimmy Pritchard
 Dilshad Vadsaria as Mary Goodwin, Otto's twin sister, co-founder of Lookinglass
 Adhir Kalyan as Otto Goodwin, Mary's twin brother, co-founder of Lookinglass
 Ciara Bravo as Gracie Pritchard, Duval's daughter and Jimmy's granddaughter
 Tim DeKay as Duval Pritchard, Jimmy's son, an FBI agent
 Vanessa Lengies as Alexa, Mary's assistant

Guest
 Philip Baker Hall as old Jimmy Pritchard
 Amanda Detmer as Helen, Jimmy's daughter and Duval's sister.
 Scott Menville as Arthur (voice), the Goodwins' computer.
 Rod Hallett as Hart Watkins.
 Adan Canto as Connor Graff
 Diana Bang as Emma Peng

Episodes

Production
The show was picked up by Fox to series as a last-minute addition to the lineup on May 8, 2015, first titled The Frankenstein Code, with the series being set in Los Angeles, before undergoing name changes to Lookinglass in August and finally once again to Second Chance in November; the setting was also changed to King County, Washington, as well. In October, the original order was reduced to an 11-episode season.

Critical reception
The show was met with an average response from critics. On Metacritic, it holds a rating of 47/100 based on 18 reviews. On Rotten Tomatoes, it holds an approval rating of 30% based on 27 reviews, with an average rating of 4.2/10. The critics' consensus reads: "Second Chance boasts a few interesting ideas and Robert Kazinsky's game performance, but there aren't enough functioning parts in what's ultimately yet another mediocre take on the Frankenstein myth."

See also
 Now and Again
 Self/less
 Seconds

References

External links
 
 

2016 American television series debuts
2016 American television series endings
2010s American crime drama television series
2010s American science fiction television series
American action television series
English-language television shows
Television series by 20th Century Fox Television
Television shows set in Seattle
Works based on Frankenstein
Fox Broadcasting Company original programming
Television shows about death
Brain transplantation in fiction
Fiction about superhuman features or abilities